Load value injection (LVI) is an attack on Intel microprocessors that can be used to attack Intel's Software Guard Extensions (SGX) technology. It is a development of the previously known Meltdown security vulnerability. Unlike Meltdown, which can only read hidden data, LVI can inject data values, and is resistant to the countermeasures so far used to mitigate the Meltdown vulnerability.

In theory, any processor affected by Meltdown may be vulnerable to LVI, but , LVI is only known to affect Intel microprocessors. Intel has published a guide to mitigating the vulnerability by using compiler technology, requiring existing software to be recompiled to add LFENCE memory barrier instructions at every potentially vulnerable point in the code. However, this mitigation appears likely to result in substantial performance reductions in the recompiled code.

See also 
 Transient execution CPU vulnerabilities

References

External links 
 
 Intel's analysis of the LVI vulnerability

Hardware bugs
Intel x86 microprocessors
Side-channel attacks
Speculative execution security vulnerabilities
2020 in computing
X86 architecture
X86 memory management